Advocate G. Steephen is an Indian politician belonging to the CPI(M). He represents Aruvikkara in the Kerala Legislative Assembly. In the 2021 elections, he defeated the incumbent MLA K. S. Sabarinadhan by a margin of 5046 votes.

References 

Kerala MLAs 2021–2026
Communist Party of India (Marxist) politicians from Kerala
Living people
1969 births